Orlebar Brown is a British clothing brand specialising in tailored men's swim shorts.

The company was founded by photographer Adam Brown after he identified a gap in the market for smart men's swimwear, and was launched in March 2007.

Today, the company is still directed by Adam Brown, as well as CEO Paul Donoghue. They are based in West London and employ over 50 people.

Products
Orlebar Brown specialises in men's swim shorts based on the 17-piece pattern of a pair of traditional men's suit trousers. They feature a four-part shaped waistband, zip fly closure and side fasteners. The Italian zippers on the fly and the back pocket are applied by hand, although the pocket itself and darts are machine applied.

While Orlebar Brown is best known for its swimwear, 55 per cent of the company's sales are from non-swimwear with the company offering a selection of rash guards, shorts, polo shirts, long and short sleeve shirts, jumpers, sweatshirts and, from 2016, shoes that can be worn in water.

In 2018, Orlebar Brown introduced Summer Sport, a capsule collection featuring technical fabrics, designed to equip customers for summer activities such as beach volleyball and surfing. The campaign was fronted by Jeremy Jauncey, founder of Beautiful Destinations.

The company has an app, #SnapShorts, which allows customers to design their own swim shorts by uploading a photograph. Their design can be made into a bespoke pair of shorts or shared on social media.

History

In summer 2006, Adam Brown had the idea for Orlebar Brown on holiday in India and decided to partner with an old acquaintance Julia Simpson-Orlebar to launch the brand.

The Orlebar Brown website officially launched in March 2007, selling to 105 countries.

Julia Simpson-Orlebar left the business amicably in 2008 however she remains a shareholder.

In 2011, the Orlebar Brown US website was launched, expanding their horizons internationally. Today 30 per cent of their business comes from the US.

In August 2013, Orlebar Brown raised £8 million (US$12.4 million) from private-equity firm Piper, in exchange for a minority stake and appointed Paul Donoghue as global commercial director.

In 2014, the business made £12m, up from £7m the year before. The brand expects to reach £20 million (about US$28.8 million) in revenue in 2016.

In September 2018, it was announced that Chanel had acquired the company with Adam Brown retaining his role as creative director.

Online and offline presence

Physical shops

Orlebar Brown opened their first shop on Ledbury Road in Notting Hill, London in 2011.

They now have shops in Notting Hill, Mayfair, Canary Wharf, Wimbledon, Sloane Avenue, Harrods and Bicester Village.

Orlebar Brown also has a physical international presence with shops in Cannes and St Tropez in France, Mykonos in Greece, Soho and East Hampton in New York City, Miami and Palm Beach, Turkey, Noosa, Bondi Beach and Brisbane in Australia, Kuwait and Dubai.

As well as multiple physical shops and an online presence, Orlebar Brown also has over 300 wholesale accounts including Selfridges, Bergdorf Goodman and Barneys New York and franchises around the world

Infrastructure
Orlebar Brown's headquarters and offices are located in West London. In 2013 they appointed Torque, a logistics company, to manage all of their European distribution. Orlebar Brown operates a 550,000 square feet distribution centre in Wortley, Leeds.

Orlebar Brown's swim shorts are made in Portugal by the factory Petratex where they pass by a minimum 12-stage manufacture process.

Celebrity endorsement and collaborations
Daniel Craig wore Orlebar Brown sky blue 'Setter' shorts in the role of James Bond in the 2012 film Skyfall.

Various celebrities have been seen wearing Orlebar Brown swim shorts including Jay Z, Hugh Jackman, Sir Paul McCartney, David Gandy, Cristiano Ronaldo, Johannes Huebl and Gary Lineker

In March 2018, Orlebar Brown collaborated with Australian Formula 1 racing driver Daniel Ricciardo for a collection of limited-edition swim shorts.

In July 2018, Orlebar Brown partnered with EON Productions for an exclusive collection of four swim shorts using iconic poster art from the James Bond films Dr. No, Thunderball, You Only Live Twice and Live And Let Die.

References

External links

Clothing brands of the United Kingdom
Swimwear brands
British companies established in 2007
Companies based in the City of Westminster